Fangliao is a railway station of the Taiwan Railways Administration at the junction of the Pingtung line and the South-link line. It is located in Fangliao Township, Pingtung County, Taiwan.

Overview
The station has two island platforms. It is a class three station.

History
15 December 1941: The station opened as a terminal station of the West Coast line.
August 1943: The section between Linjian and Fangliao was removed due to war.
16 January 1953: A new station opened.
16 December 1991: The South-link line (which extends from this station) opens with a ceremony at the station.
15 January 1992: The South-link line opens for temporary service.
5 October 1992: The South-link line fully opens for service, thus completing a complete rail network loop around Taiwan.

Around the station
Fangliao Township downtown
Fangliao F3 Art District
Fangliao Township Office
Fangliao Fishing Area
Pingtung County Police Department, Fangliao Branch
Fangliao High School
Bus transfer stations

See also
 List of railway stations in Taiwan

References

1941 establishments in Taiwan
Railway stations in Pingtung County
Railway stations opened in 1941
Railway stations served by Taiwan Railways Administration